The 1844 Delaware gubernatorial election was held on November 5, 1844. Whig Governor William B. Cooper was unable to seek re-election to a second term. Thomas Stockton, the former New Castle County Register in Chancery, ran as the Whig nominee to succeed Cooper. He faced former State Senator William Tharp, the Democratic nominee. Despite the state's strong financial condition, Whigs came close to losing their grip on power; Stockton only defeated Tharp by 45 votes, or 0.37%. However, Stockton died a year into his term, on March 2, 1846, elevating the Speaker of the State Senate, Joseph Maull, to the governorship, and triggering a special election in 1846. Maull, served just two months before he, too died, elevating State House Speaker William Temple to the governorship.

General election

Results

References

Bibliography
 
 
 

1844
Delaware
Gubernatorial